Mount View High School may refer to:

 Mount View High School (Maine) in Thorndike, Maine
 Mount View High School (West Virginia) in Welch, West Virginia
 Mount View High School (Cessnock) in Cessnock, New South Wales
 Mount View High School (1931–1974) in Greater Victoria, BC